The 5th Hanoi International Film Festival opened on October 27 and closed on October 31, 2018, at Hanoi Friendship Cultural Palace, with the slogan "Cinema - Integration and Sustainable Development" (Vietnamese: "Điện ảnh - Hội nhập và phát triển bền vững").

After 2 rounds of selection, the Organizing Committee selected 147 films from 45 countries and territories to participate in the festival programs. Vietnamese cinema has 1 feature-length film, 10 short films, and 35 films of various genres shown in the Panorama Cinema Program and the Contemporary Vietnamese Film Program. For the first time, the festival has a closing film.

Programs
Many programs are held within the framework of the 5th Hanoi International Film Festival:

Ceremonies - At Hanoi Friendship Cultural Palace, 91 Trần Hưng Đạo Street, Hoàn Kiếm District:
 Opening ceremony: 20:00, Saturday, October 27 (live broadcast on VTV2)
 Closing ceremony: 20:10, Wednesday, October 31 (live broadcast on VTV1)

Professional activities - At Hanoi Daewoo Hotel, 360 Kim Mã Street, Ba Đình District:
 Exhibition Special filming scene in Vietnam (Vietnamese: "Bối cảnh quay phim đặc sắc tại Việt Nam"): October 27–31
 The HANIFF Campus: October 27–30
 The Film Project Market: October 27–30
 Seminar Polish Cinema Highlights (Vietnamese: "Tiêu điểm Điện ảnh Ba Lan"): 09:00 – 12:00 Sunday, October 28
 Seminar Experience of International Success of Iranian Cinema (Vietnamese: "Kinh nghiệm thành công quốc tế của Điện ảnh Iran"): 09:00 - 12:00 Monday, October 29

Movie screenings in theaters:
 National Cinema Center (Room 3, 5, 7, 9): 3rd floor, 87 Láng Hạ Street, Ba Đình District
 Opening Screening – Shoplifters : 15:00 Saturday, October 27
 Closing Screening – A Fantastic Woman : 15:00 Wednesday, October 31
 BHD Star Phạm Ngọc Thạch Movie Theater (Room 1, 2, 4): 8th floor, Vincom Shopping Center, No. 2 Phạm Ngọc Thạch Street, Đống Đa District
 August Cinema Theater (Room 4): 45 Hàng Bài Street, Hoàn Kiếm District
 Kim Đồng Cinema Theater (Room 1, 3): 19 Hàng Bài Street, Hoàn Kiếm District

Outdoor movie screenings - At Lý Thái Tổ Monument Square, Hoàn Kiếm District:
 Movie The Tailor / Cô Ba Sài Gòn : 20:00 Sunday, October 28
 Movie Anida and Floating Circus : 20:00 Monday, October 29
 Movie Ellipsis : 20:00 Tuesday, October 30

Juries & Mentors

Juries
There are 3 jury panels established for this film festival:

Feature film:
 Oguri Kohei , director & screenwriter - Chairman
 Allan Starski , production designer & set decorator
 Shahram Mokri , director 
 Lee Dong-ha , producer
 Ngô Thanh Vân , actress, director & producer

Short film:
 Jukka-Pekka Laakso , director of Tampere Film Festival - Chairman
 Raymond Red , director
 Lý Thái Dũng , artist & director of photography

Network for Promotion of Asian Cinema (NETPAC):
 Lee Choong-jik , academic, producer & director of Jeonju International Film Festival - Chairman
 Tsengel Davaasambuu , producer
 Nguyễn Thị Hồng Ngát , screenwriter & producer

In addition, the "Film Project Market" is jointly organized by Vietnam Cinema Department and BHD/Vietnam Media Corp, including 2 categories: "International Project Market" with 3 outstanding feature film projects from countries in Asia-Pacific region and "Domestic Project Market" include 5 outstanding feature film projects of Vietnam. The best project will receive a prize of VND 50 million sponsored by BHD/Vietnam Media Corp.

Mentors for the HANIFF Campus
"The HANIFF Campus" is jointly organized by Vietnam Cinema Department and Redbridge Co., Ltd. The camp will have 2 classes under the guidance of:

Directing & Producing Class:
 Homayoon Ass'adian , producer, director, screenwriter
 Rouhollah Hejazi , producer, director, screenwriter
 Allan Starski , director
 Phạm Nhuệ Giang , director
 Nguyễn Hoàng Điệp , director

Acting Class
 David Wenham , actor, producer
 Đỗ Thị Hải Yến , actress
 Guest: Chi Bảo , actor

Official Selection - In Competition

Feature film
These 12 films were selected to compete for the official awards in Feature Film category:

Highlighted title indicates Best Feature Film Award winner.

Short film
These 29 short films were selected to compete for official awards in Short Film category, divided into 9 screening sessions as follows:

Session 1:
 When the Smoke Collides (32′) 
 Hunger (14′) 
 Roommate / Bạn cùng phòng (25′) 
 Radio Dolores (Animated, 18′)  

Session 2:
 Gharshelegh (Documentary, 16′) 
 Su (18′) 
 Faucet (15′) 

Session 3:
 From a Distance (5′) 
 Haru’s New Year (19′) 
 Snowbirds (48′) 
 Poliangular (Animated, 8′) 

Session 4:
 Happy Family (24′) 
 One Kilo of Fly Wings (Documentary, 30′) 
 Josephin (Animated, 5′) 
 Pas D’yeux (Animated, 4′) 
 The Secret of Children / Bí mật của những đứa trẻ (Animated, 10′) 

Session 5:
 Once (35′) 
 Two Children / Hai đứa trẻ (Documentary, 51′) 

Session 6:
 Destiny (14′) 
 Mother - Earth for All / Một đất mẹ cho tất cả (Documentary, 60′) 
 The Warm Light / Vầng sáng ấm áp (Animated, 10′) 
 The Mannequin / Cậu bé Ma-nơ-canh (Animated, 10′) 

Session 7:
 So Close So Far, the Ancestral Forest / Gần mà xa – Khu rừng của tổ tiên (Documentary, 42′) 
 Homecoming Day / Ngày về (Documentary, 27′) 

Session 8:
 My Hanoi (Documentary, 52′) 
 Endless Journey / Hành trình bất tận (Documentary, 50′) 

Session 9:
 Muzeon-Stephan Ramniceanu (Documentary, 52′) 
 Where is My Route (12′) 
 Permanent Resident (20′) 

Highlighted title indicates Best Short Film Award winner.

Official Selection - Out of Competition
These feature and short films were selected for out-of-competition programs:

Opening
 Shoplifters – Kore-eda Hirokazu

Panorama: World Cinema

Feature film

 Amin & Akvan – Zohal Razavi 
 Anida and Floating Circus / Anida y el Circo Flotante – Liliana Romero 
 The Midwife / Sage Femme – Martin Provost  
 Nervous Translation – Shireen Seno 
 A Letter to the President – Roya Sadat 
 Painting Life – Dr. Biju 
 Kathaa '72 – Prabin Syangbo 
 The Wild Pear Tree / Ahlat Ağacı – Nuri Bilge Ceylan   
 Father and Son / Cha cõng con – Lương Đình Dũng 
 A Haunting Hitchkie / 히치하이크 – Jeong Hee-jae 
 Love+Sling / 레슬러 – Kim Dae-woong 
 Delia and Sammy – Therese Cayaba 
 Gutland – Govinda Van Maele   
 Talking Money – Sebastian Winkels   
 Ellipsis – David Wenham 
 Guang – Quek Shio Chuan 
 The Baggage – Zig Madamba Dulay 
 Under Construction / আন্ডার কন্সট্রাকশন – Rubaiyat Hossain 
 Blood and the Moon – Tommaso Cotronei  
 The Tree Goddess / වෛෂ්ණාවී – Sumitra Peries 
 Tomorrow’s Power – Amy Miller 
 All You Can Eat Buddha – Ian Lagarde 
 Die Tomorrow – Nawapol Thamrongrattanarit 
 A Ciambra – Jonas Carpignano 
 Insane Mother / Солиот эх – Ishdorjiin Odonchimeg 
 Looking for Kafka / 愛上卡夫卡 – Jade Y. Chen 
 The Darkest Days of Us / Los días más oscuros de nosotras – Astrid Rondero 
 Last of the Elephant Men – Arnaud Bouquet, Daniel Ferguson  
 Where I Belong / しゃぼん玉 – Azuma Shinji 
 Poppy Goes to Hollywood Redux – Sok Visal  
 Decision: Liquidation / Reshenie o likvidatsii – Aleksandr Aravin 
 The Seen and Unseen / Sekala Niskala – Kamila Andini    
 On Body and Soul / Testről és lélekről – Ildikó Enyedi 
 Night Accident / Tunku kyrsyk – Temirbek Birnazarov 
 The Kid from the Big Apple / 我来自纽约 – Jess Teong 
 Walking Past the Future / 路過未來 – Li Ruijun 
 Stray – Dustin Feneley 
 Pomegranate Orchard / Nar bağı – Ilgar Najaf 
 Crossing a Shadow –  Augusto Tamayo 
 Please, Care / Paki – Giancarlo Abrahan

Short film

Group 1:
 Diapers for Melquiades (19′) 
 Fatima Marie Torres and the Invasion of Space Shuttle Pinas 25 (17′) 
 It’s Easier to Raise Cattle (17′) 

Group 2:
 Konfrontasi (14′) 
 Joko (22′) 
 Employee of the Month (13′)  
 Kampung Tapir (Documentary, 17′) 
 The Veiled Willow (21′) 

Group 3:
 On This Side (30′) 
 Smile of Nazareno (15′) 
 Still (14′) 
 Mother (21′)

Country-in-Focus: Poland  

 Nights and Days / Noce i dnie – Jerzy Antczak (1975)
 Sweet Rush / Tatarak – Andrzej Wajda (2009)
 Ida – Paweł Pawlikowski (2013)
 Plan B – Kinga Dębska (2018)
 The Promised Land / Ziemia obiecana – Andrzej Wajda (1975)
 The Pianist – Roman Polanski (2002)
 Warsaw 44 – Jan Komasa (2014)
 Ashes and Diamonds / Popiół i diament – Andrzej Wajda (1958)
 One Way Ticket to the Moon / Bilet na ksiezyc – Jacek Bromski (2013)

Country-in-Selection: Iran  

 The Home / Ev – Asghar Yousefinejad (2017)
 Taste of Cherry / Ta'm e guilass – Abbas Kiarostami (1997)
 Kupal – Kazem Mollaie (2017)
 A Special Day / Yek rouz bekhosos – Homayoun Assadian (2017)
 The Salesman / Forušande – Asghar Farhadi (2016)
 The White Balloon / Badkonake sefid – Jafar Panahi (1995)
 Reza – Alireza Motamedi (2018)
 Invasion / Hojoom – Shahram Mokri (2017)

Contemporary Vietnamese Films

Feature film

 100 ngày bên em / 100 Days of Sunshine – Vũ Ngọc Phượng
 11 niềm hy vọng / 11 Hopes – Robie Nguyễn
 49 ngày 2 / 49 Days 2 – Nhất Trung
 798Mười / 798Ten – Dustin Nguyễn
 Bạn gái tôi là sếp / She’s the Boss – Hàm Trần
 Chàng vợ của em / My Mr. Wife – Charlie Nguyễn
 Chờ em đến ngày mai / Until You – Đinh Tuấn Vũ
 Có căn nhà nằm nghe nắng mưa / Like an Old House – Mai Thế Hiệp, Trầm Nguyễn Bình Nguyên
 Cô Ba Sài Gòn / The Tailor – Trần Bửu Lộc, Nguyễn Lê Phương Khanh
 Cô gái đến từ hôm qua / The Girl from Yesterday – Phan Gia Nhật Linh
 Đảo của dân ngụ cư / The Way Station  – Hồng Ánh
 Dạ cổ hoài lang / Night Drumbeats Cause Longing for Absent Husband – Nguyễn Quang Dũng
 Em chưa 18 / Jailbait – Lê Thanh Sơn
 Lôi Báo / Be the Hero – Victor Vu
 Ở đây có nắng / Here Comes the Sun – Đỗ Nam
 Sắc đẹp ngàn cân / 200 Pounds Beauty – James Ngô
 Song lang / The Tap Box – Leon Quang Lê
 Tháng năm rực rỡ / Go-Go Sisters – Nguyễn Quang Dũng
 Vệ sĩ Sài Gòn / Saigon Bodyguards – Ochiai Ken
 Việt Nam thời bao cấp / Vietnam's Subsidy Period (Documentary) – Trần Tuấn Hiệp
 Yêu em bất chấp / My Sassy Girl  – Văn Công Viễn
 Yêu đi, đừng sợ! / Kiss & Spell – Stephane Gauger

Short film

Group 1:
 Bố ơi con ước / Daddy, I wish (23′)
 Hồi sinh / Revival (28′)
 Dòng chảy không có tận cùng / Endleess Flow of Life (40′)
 Cóc con Bitus / The Little Toad (10′)

Group 2:
 Nỗi niềm tứ nữ / The Innermost Feelings of the Four (23′)
 Khát vọng Hoàng Sa - Trường Sa / Aspiration of Paracel and Spratly Islands (40′)
 Hành trình hóa giải / The Journey of Reconciliation (35′)
 Cô bé rơm vàng / Little Straw Doll (10′)

Group 3:
 Tâm tình của gốm / Sentiment of Pottery (31′)
 Truyền thuyết chiếc khăn Piêu / Tale of Pieu Scarf (11′)
 Niềm vui làm mật / Making Honey Delight (31′)
 Người anh hùng áo vải / Hero Wearing Duffle (30′)
 Hải Âu bé bỏng / A Little Seagull (10′)

Closing
 A Fantastic Woman – Sebastián Lelio

Awards
The official awards were awarded at the closing ceremony of the festival, on the evening of October 31. Students of the programs "The HANIFF Campus" and "The Film Market Project" were awarded 1 day before, on the evening of October 30.

In Competition - Feature film
 Best Feature Film: The Dark Room 
 Jury Prize for Feature Film: Pale Folks 
 Other nominees: Student A , Silent Night , Eva 
 Best Director: Piotr Domalewski – Silent Night 
 Other nominees: Rouhollah Hejazi – The Dark Room , Vladimir Todorović – Pale Folks 
 Best Leading Actor: Christian Bables – Signal Rock 
 Other nominees: Saed Soheili – The Dark Room , Dawid Ogrodnik – Silent Night 
 Best Leading Actress: Phương Anh Đào – Summer in Closed Eyes 
 Other nominees: Sareh Bayat – The Dark Room , Kim Hwan-hee – Student A

In Competition - Short film
 Best Short Film: Su – Aizhana Kassymbek 
 Jury Prize for Short Film: Two Children – Tạ Quỳnh Tư 
 Other nominee: Happy Family – Eden Junjung 
 Best Young Director of a Short Film: Nguyễn Lê Hoàng Việt – Roommate

NETPAC Award
 NETPAC's Award for Asian Cinema Promotion: Student A

Audience Choice Award for Vietnamese Film
 Most Favourite Out-of-Competition Film: My Mr. Wife

The HANIFF Campus
 Best Student - Directing & Producing Class: Crisanto Calvento 
 Best Male Student - Acting Class: Công Dương 
 Best Female Student - Acting Class: Vũ Kim Anh

The Film Project Market
 Best Project: John Denver Trending – Arden Rod Condez 
 Jury Prize for Film Project: Good Morning, and Good Night! – Chung Chí Công 
 Other nominees: Binh’s Banh Mi – Andrew Paul , 99 Lives With You – Phạm Hữu Nghĩa , Little Fishes in Paradise – Nguyễn Khắc Huy

References

External links
 

2018 film festivals
Hanoi International Film Festival
2018 in Vietnam
2018 in Vietnamese cinema